Associação Atlética Batel, commonly known as Batel, is a Brazilian football team based in Guarapuava, Paraná state. They competed in the Série C twice.

History
The club was founded on March 17, 1951, in Batel neighborhood, Guarapuava. They competed in the Série C in 1994 and in 1995, being eliminated in the Second Stage in both editions of the competition.

Stadium
Associação Atlética Batel play their home games at Estádio Waldomiro Gelinski, nicknamed Estádio Lobo Solitário. The stadium has a maximum capacity of 7,000 people.

References

Association football clubs established in 1951
Football clubs in Paraná (state)
Guarapuava
1951 establishments in Brazil